Silvester John Brito (September 26, 1937 - October 7, 2018) was an American poet and academic. He was an associate professor of anthropology and folklore at the University of Wyoming.

Early life and education 
Brito was born September 26, 1937, in Delta, Colorado. He was of Comanche and Purépecha descent. Brito completed a Ph.D. in Folklore at Indiana University.

Career 
Brito was an associate professor for the University of Wyoming, teaching anthropology, American folklore studies, Chicano, and religious studies. Brito was a member of M.E.C.h.A. and Keepers of the Fire.

Brito published several books of poetry, Man From a Rainbow, Looking Through A Squared Off Circle, and Red Cedar Warrior, and an ethnography, The Way of A Peyote Roadman. His poetry has appeared in CALLALOO (a creative writing publishing forum at the Texas A&M University in College Station), in the American Indian anthology, Studies In American Indian Literature: Returning The Gift (University of Arizona Press), and in The Blue Cloud Quarterly Vol. 28, No. 4 .

Personal life 
Brito was married to Carol (Coble) Brito for 56 years and had four children: Desiree, Michael, Juan and Jude. His parents Benjamin and Jessie Brito predeceased him. Brito died October 7, 2018, in Cheyenne, Wyoming.

References

1937 births
2018 deaths
American writers of Mexican descent
American people of Comanche descent
American people of Purépecha descent
People from Delta, Colorado
Indiana University alumni
University of Wyoming faculty
20th-century American male writers